Blacklight is a 2022 action thriller film directed and co-written by Mark Williams.  The film stars Liam Neeson as a brooding FBI fixer who gets involved in a government conspiracy; Emmy Raver-Lampman, Taylor John Smith, and Aidan Quinn also star.

Blacklight was released in the United States on February 11, 2022 by Briarcliff Entertainment. The film was a box office bomb, grossing $16 million against its $43 million budget, and was panned by critics, with many naming it among the worst films of Neeson's career.

Plot
Political activist Sofia Flores speaks at a rally in Washington, D.C. about women's and racial equality. That evening, she is killed in a deliberately planned hit-and-run outside of her home.

Travis Block, a Vietnam War veteran, works off-the-books for FBI Director Gabriel Robinson as a fixer. After completing one mission, he tells Robinson he wants to retire and spend more time with his daughter and granddaughter, but Robinson is reluctant to let him go. Instead he is given a new assignment to bring in undercover FBI Agent Dusty Crane.

However, Crane goes rogue and contacts a journalist, Mira Jones, claiming to have information about Flores' death. Escaping several times from Block and the FBI, Crane arranges to meet Jones at a museum. Block follows Jones to the meeting but Crane escapes again. Crane tells Block that Robinson ordered Flores' killing before he is shot dead by two FBI Agents.

Block and Jones meet again and she tells him that Crane claimed to have information about Operation Unity, a top secret FBI program run by Robinson that kills innocent civilians, including Flores. Block confronts Robinson about Operation Unity, but Robinson brushes off his questions and warns Block not to interfere.

Jones's editor, Drew, writes a story about Crane's mysterious death using her sources. That evening, he is followed home and killed after a car accident by the same two FBI Agents that killed Crane and Flores. Meanwhile, Block's family goes missing.

Jones convinces a distressed Block to help her uncover the mystery of Operation Unity. He tells her that Robinson has a safe in his house with government secrets. He confronts Robinson at his house and forces him to open the safe, which contains a hard drive with information about Operation Unity. Robinson escapes with the help of several FBI Agents, who engage in a gunfight with Block. Block defeats the agents and retrieves the hard drive.

Block and Jones review the hard drive and discover that Crane was in love with his assignment, Flores. Robinson had her killed after Crane got too attached to her. Block confronts Robinson with the truth about Operation Unity, and forces him to turn himself in to the authorities. Robinson is arrested for his crimes, Jones completes her story about the government cover-up, and Block retires and reunites with his family who had been placed in Witness Protection but are now brought back home.

Cast
 Liam Neeson as Travis Block
 Emmy Raver-Lampman as Mira Jones
 Taylor John Smith as Dusty Crane
 Aidan Quinn as Gabriel Robinson
 Claire van der Boom as Amanda Block
 Yael Stone as Helen Davidson
 Tim Draxl as Drew Hawthorne
 Georgia Flood as Pearl
 Melanie Jarnson as Sofia Flores
 Andrew Shaw as Jordan Lockhart
 Zac Lemons as Wallace
 Gabriella Sengos as Natalie Block
 Daniel Turbill as Running Man

Production
Principal photography of the film started in November 2020 in Melbourne, Australia. In January 2021 it was announced that a car chase scene would be filmed in Canberra.

Mark Isham composed the film score. A film soundtrack has been released.

Release
Blacklight was released in the United States by Open Road Films and Briarcliff Entertainment on February 11, 2022. The film was released video-on-demand on March 3, while the film released on Blu-ray and DVD in May 3 by Universal Pictures Home Entertainment.

Reception

Box office
In the United States and Canada, Blacklight was released alongside Death on the Nile and Marry Me, and was projected to gross $1–5 million from 2,772 theaters in its opening weekend. The film went on to debut to $3.5 million, finishing fifth at the box office. Overall audiences during its opening were 64% male, 83% above the age of 25, 58% above 35, and 35% above 45. The ethnic breakdown of the audience showed that 53% were Caucasian, 14% Hispanic and Latino Americans, 15% African American, and 18% Asian or other. The film finished tenth at the box office in its second weekend with $1.7 million. It dropped out of the box office top ten in its third weekend with $878,687.

Critical response
  Audiences polled by PostTrak gave the film a 58% positive score, with 39% saying they would definitely recommend it.

Joe Leydon of Variety said: "If you approach it with sufficiently lowered expectations, and have fond memories of the '70s paranoid dramas that obviously inspired director and co-writer Mark Williams, this might be your house-brand jam." Frank Scheck of The Hollywood Reporter wrote: "Lacking a high concept or memorable central character, the film is a by-the-numbers actioner that coasts on its star's soulful gravitas and low-key charisma."

References

External links
 

2022 films
2022 action thriller films
Australian action thriller films
American action thriller films
Films set in Washington, D.C.
Films shot in Melbourne
Films about corruption in the United States
Films about journalists
Films about obsessive–compulsive disorder
Films about whistleblowing
Films about the Federal Bureau of Investigation
2020s English-language films
Films about the mass media in the United States
Films scored by Mark Isham
2020s American films